Brampton North is a provincial electoral district in Ontario. It was originally created prior to the 1987 election from part of Brampton. It existed for the 1987, 1990, and 1995 elections. It was abolished in 1999 into Bramalea—Gore—Malton—Springdale, Brampton Centre,  Brampton West—Mississauga.  For the 2018 election, it was re-created from Bramalea—Gore—Malton, Brampton—Springdale, and Brampton West.

Boundaries
In 1987, the boundaries consisted of the City of Brampton north of the following line (from east to west): from the city limits going east along Highway 7 to Queen Street East, then west to Kennedy Road, then north along Kennedy Road to Vodden Street, then west to Main Street, then north along Main Street and Highway 10 to Highway 7 and then west to the city limits.

Members of Provincial Parliament

Election results

References

External links
Map of Brampton North for 2018 election

Ontario provincial electoral districts
Politics of Brampton